Eoin Dillon (born 1 June 1987) is an Irish hurler who plays for Cork Intermediate Championship club Milford. He played for the Cork senior hurling team for three years, during which time he usually lined out as a full-back.

Dillon began his hurling career at club level with Milford, while his early prowess also saw him selected for the Cork Institute of Technology in the Fitzgibbon Cup and the Avondhu divisional team.

At inter-county level, Dillon was part of the Cork minor team that won back-to-back Munster Championships in 2004 and 2005 before later winning a Munster Championship with the under-21 team in 2007. He was at midfield for the Cork intermediate All-Ireland Championship-winning team in 2009. Dillon joined the Cork senior team in 2010. From his debut he made a number of National League appearances but never lined out in the Championship. He left the panel in 2012.

Career statistics

Honours

Cork
All-Ireland Intermediate Hurling Championship (1): 2009
Munster Intermediate Hurling Championship (1): 2009
Munster Under-21 Hurling Championship (1): 2007
Munster Minor Hurling Championship (1): 2004, 2005

References

1987 births
Living people
Milford (Cork) hurlers
Cork inter-county hurlers